Randi Helseth (February 9, 1905 – September 24, 1991) was a Norwegian singer.

Helseth was born in Oslo. She made her debut in 1934 as a concert singer, and in 1938 as an opera singer. Helseth was associated with the National Theatre in Oslo, the National Theater in Bergen, and the Norwegian National Opera, and she performed as a soloist both in Norway and abroad, including the United States. She taught the soprano Solveig Kringlebotn.

Helseth won the Norwegian Music Critics Award for 1949/1950. In May 2000, a bust of Helseth  by Nina Sundbye was unveiled in Ås.

Discography
 Randi Helseth. Pro Musica, 1985

References

External links
Randi Helseth at the National Theatre in Oslo
Randi Helseth at the Norwegian Music History Archive

1905 births
1991 deaths
20th-century Norwegian women opera singers
Norwegian sopranos
Musicians from Oslo